Anything But Words is the debut studio album by Banks & Steelz, a collaborative project between Interpol vocalist Paul Banks and Wu-Tang Clan member RZA. It was released August 26, 2016, on Warner Bros. Records. Recording of the album dates back to 2013, with a demo of early material being created two years prior. Anything But Words features guest appearances by other musicians, as well as other Wu-Tang Clan members, and additional production from Ari Levine and Andrew Wyatt, among others. Five singles were released from the album; "Love and War", featuring Ghostface Killah, "Giant", "Speedway Sonora", "Sword in the Stone", featuring Kool Keith, and "Anything But Words".

Background and recording
When asked by his manager who he would like to work together with musically, RZA responded with Interpol member Paul Banks. When asked about his choice in a 2013 Rolling Stone interview, RZA stated that Banks "just has an energy about him" and that "it [would] be great" if the two were to collaborate. In 2011, during which the duo were not planning on making an album together, a demo of material was created with Banks providing vocals over a beat developed by RZA. The first public mention of the duo's collaborations was made in the same Rolling Stone interview. It was during 2013 that the duo began working on an album together. RZA expected the album to take about a year to finish. During 2014, Banks' main project Interpol recorded a studio album titled El Pintor, which was then released in September of that year. The duo wanted to release their material in 2015, but later realized that the material was unfinished.

Release and promotion
The duo premiered the album's lead single, "Love and War", featuring fellow Wu-Tang Clan member Ghostface Killah, on the Apple Music radio station Beats 1. A video for the song, which pays tribute to a scene from the film Reservoir Dogs, was also released the following day. Details for Anything But Words, as well as tour dates, were released on June 9. Also released on that day was the album's second single, "Giant". "Speedway Sonora" was released as the album's third single on July 14. "Sword in the Stone", featuring rapper Kool Keith, was released as the album's fourth single on July 28 and the album's title track was released as the fifth single on August 12.

Track listing
All songs produced by Paul Banks and RZA except where noted. Credits adapted from AllMusic.

Charts

Release history

Notes and references
Notes

References

External links
 

2016 debut albums
Warner Records albums